Melanie at Carnegie Hall is a 1973 double album released by Melanie and the second concert record after the release of Leftover Wine in 1970. The album contains material from Melanie's Carnegie Hall concerts of February 2 and 3 in 1973.

It is the only Melanie album to contain her Top 40 hit "Bitter Bad" (which was a single-only release).

Track listing
All songs written by Melanie Safka except where noted.

Disc 1:
Introduction (by Alison Steele and Scott Muni of WNEW-FM in New York)
"Baby Guitar"
"Lay Your Hands Across the Six Strings"
"Pretty Boy Floyd" (Woody Guthrie)
"Some Day I'll Be a Farmer"
"Babe Rainbow"
"It's Me Again"
"Any Guy"
"Brand New Key"
"Some Say (I Got Devil)"
"Bitter Bad"
"Psychotherapy"

Disc 2:
"Together Alone"
"Beautiful People"
"Medley: Hearing the News / Seasons to Change / Peace Will Come"
"My Rainbow Race" (Pete Seeger)
"I Am Not a Poet"
"Ring the Living Bell / Shine The Living Light"
"Actress"

Personnel
Melanie - acoustic guitar, vocals

Charts

References 

Melanie (singer) albums
1973 live albums
Albums recorded at Carnegie Hall